Kurt Kuenne is an American filmmaker and composer. He has directed a number of short and feature films, including Rent-a-Person, the YouTube film Validation, described as "a romantic epic in miniature", and the documentary Dear Zachary: A Letter to a Son About His Father.

Life

Kuenne was born October 24, 1973 in Mountain View, California He grew up in Northern California and began making films aged seven on Super 8 film and later video. He attended Lynbrook High School and then studied film at University of Southern California's School of Cinema-Television, where he made Remembrances (1995) and was awarded the Harold Lloyd Scholarship in Film Editing. Kuenne then studied film composing, but returned to directing with feature Scrapbook (1999). In 2002 he was awarded an Academy of Motion Picture Arts and Sciences Nicholl Fellowship in Screenwriting for a script titled Mason Mule.

Career

Validation
Validation (2007), written, directed, and scored by Kuenne, was distributed through Gay Hendricks's Spiritual Cinema Circle and is a short film about a parking attendant (played by T. J. Thyne) who dispenses compliments to his customers. It won Best Short Grand Prize at the 2007 Heartland Film Festival, and The Independent Critic rated it A+. It has received more than 10 million YouTube views.

Dear Zachary
Kuenne's documentary Dear Zachary (2008), about the murder of his childhood friend Andrew Bagby, was received as a documentary that "will rip you apart inside and pour your guts out through your tear ducts". Kuenne produced, directed, and scored the movie by himself. The only financial help given were donations to expand the YouTube short film into a full length feature.

Shuffle
His latest feature film Shuffle (2011) again stars T. J. Thyne, playing a man who finds his life running out of sequence. It won the Jury Award for Best Feature at the 17th Stony Brook Film Festival.

References

External links

American male composers
Living people
USC School of Cinematic Arts alumni
American documentary filmmakers
Filmmakers from California
1973 births
People from Mountain View, California
21st-century American composers
Film directors from California
21st-century American male musicians
Lynbrook High School alumni
Screenwriters from California